Moonglow is the fourth studio album by Japanese singer-songwriter Tatsuro Yamashita, released in October 1979.

This was his first LP under the AIR label and was also the first studio album released by AIR.

Overview
Moonglow was one of Tatsuro Yamashita's studio albums that stayed the most weeks in the Oricon charts, staying in for fifty weeks. Most of the songs included in this album were written by Minako Yoshida and composed by Tatsuro Yamashita.

Before the album came out, "Let's Kiss The Sun" was released as a lead single. The song was used as a commercial song for Japan Airlines Okinawa campaign.

At this time, Yamashita's director Ryuzo Kosugi launched an independent label "AIR" within the RVC he belonged to because of his desire to take a more free production stance without being controlled by the company's restrictions. This work "Moonglow" was released in the fall of 1979 as the first new record of this new label AIR. It became a stepping stone to the next work "Ride on Time".

When the album finally came out, "Eien no Full Moon" (永遠のFull Moon) was released as a single at the same time as the album. Its B-side would include the song "Funky Flushin'" which was also included on the Moonglow album. Though both of the singles failed to enter the Oricon Singles Chart.

In 1980, the album would win in the 22nd Japan Record Awards for "Best Album Award".

2002 remastered edition
In 2002, a remastered reissue (BVCR-17016) was released as part of The RCA/AIR Years 1976-1982 series. The reissue would include three additional tracks that were previously unreleased before. It would enter the Oricon charts, peaking in at twenty-six for two weeks.

Track listing

2002 remastered edition

Personnel
"Taken from the inner sleeve notes of the 1979 album (AIR-8001)."

Musicians

Drums

Bass

Chart positions

Awards

Release history

References

1979_albums
Tatsuro Yamashita albums